Steve O'Neill is an English former professional rugby league footballer who played in the 1970s, 1980s and 1990s, and coached in the 1990s and 2000s.

Playing career

International honours
Steve O'Neill won a cap for England while at Wigan in 1981 against France.

Challenge Cup Final appearances
Steve O'Neill was an unused interchange/substitute, i.e. number 15, in Widnes 14-14 draw with Hull F.C. in the 1981–82 Challenge Cup Final during the 1981–82 season at Wembley Stadium, London on Saturday 1 May 1982, in front of a crowd of 92,147, was an unused interchange/substitute, i.e. number 15, in the 9-18 defeat by Hull F.C. in the 1981–82 Challenge Cup Final replay during the 1981–82 season at Elland Road, Leeds on Wednesday 19 May 1982, in front of a crowd of 41,171, and played left-, i.e. number 8, and scored a drop goal in Widnes' 19-6 victory over Wigan in the 1983–84 Challenge Cup Final during the 1983–84 season at Wembley Stadium, London on Saturday 5 May 1984.

County Cup Final appearances
Steve O'Neill played right-, i.e. number 10, in Wigan's 10-26 defeat by Warrington in the 1980–81 Lancashire County Cup Final during the 1980–81 season at Knowsley Road, St. Helens on Saturday 4 October 1980, played left-, i.e. number 8, in Widnes' 3-8 defeat by Leigh in the 1981–82 Lancashire County Cup Final during the 1981–82 season at Central Park, Wigan on Saturday 26 September 1981, and played left- in the 8-12 defeat by Barrow in the 1983–84 Lancashire County Cup Final during the 1983–84 season at Central Park, Wigan on Saturday 1 October 1983.

Coaching career
From 1997 to 2001, O'Neill was the coach of the Ireland national rugby league team.

Genealogical information
Steve O'Neill is the brother of the rugby league footballer, Mike O'Neill.

References

External links
Statistics at wigan.rlfans.com
Statistics at rugby.widnes.tv

Living people
England national rugby league team players
English rugby league coaches
English rugby league players
Newcastle Thunder players
Ireland national rugby league team coaches
Place of birth missing (living people)
Rugby league props
Salford Red Devils players
Swinton Lions players
Widnes Vikings players
Wigan Warriors players
Year of birth missing (living people)